Turbo-Hauser bases are amido magnesium halides that contain stoichiometric amounts of LiCl. These mixed Mg/Li amides of the type R2NMgCl⋅LiCl are used in organic chemistry as non-nucleophilic bases for metalation reactions of aromatic and heteroaromatic substrates. Compared to their LiCl free ancestors Turbo-Hauser bases show an enhanced kinetic basicity, excellent regioselectivity, high functional group tolerance and a better solubility.

Preparation 
Typically Turbo-Hauser bases are prepared by reacting an amine with a Grignard reagent or by mixing a lithium amide with stoichiometric amounts of MgCl2.

Commonly used Turbo-Hauser bases 
iPr2NMgCl·LiCl, iPr-Turbo-Hauser base

TMPMgCl·LiCl, TMP-Turbo-Hauser base, also called Knochel-Hauser Base (TMP = 2,2,6,6,tetramethylpiperidino)

Structure
So far not many structures of Turbo-Hauser bases are known. Generally, they show a complex temperature and concentration dependent behaviour in solution.
This is why it is not easy to crystallize Hauser bases and their Turbo variants.

Solid State Structure
The iPr-Turbo-Hauser base crystallizes as a dimeric amido bridged contact ion pair (CIP). Due to the high steric demand of the TMP ligand the dimerization process is sterically hindered. This is why the TMP-Turbo-Hauser base crystallizes as a monomeric CIP. 
In both structures LiCl coordinates to the magnesium amides.

Solution Structure
Although there is a great deal of information on the utility of these reagents, very little is known regarding the nature of Turbo-Hauser bases in solution. One reason for that lack of information is that (Turbo)-Hauser bases show a complex behaviour in solution.
In 2016, Neufeld et al. showed via Diffusion-Ordered Spectroscopy (DOSY) that at room temperature and high concentrations (0.6 M) the solid state structure of dimeric [iPr2NMgCl·LiCl]2 remains in solution. At lower concentrations the equilibrium is on the side of the monomeric species. Both, dimer and monomer are co-coordinated by LiCl. At temperatures below -50°C LiCl gets separated from the magnesium amide in sense of a stable [LiCl]2 dimer solvated by four THF molecules.

The solid state structure of TMPMgCl·LiCl remains almost completely in THF solution independently of temperature and concentration. Due to the high steric demand of the TMP ligand and its flexible rotation in solution, the THF molecule gets separated from the magnesium cation. The result is an unsaturated magnesium side that could explain the enhanced reactivity and selectivity of TMPMgCl·LiCl.

Knochel et al. proposed that LiCl increases the reactivity of Turbo-Grignard compounds RMgCl·LiCl (R = alkyl, aryl or vinyl) by giving the reactive bimetallic monomer a magnesiate character in sense of a solvent separated ion pair (SSIP) [Li(THF)4]+ [RMg(THF)Cl2]−.
In case of the above mentioned Turbo-Hauser bases where the alkyl group of a Grignard is replaced by an amido group (R = R'2N−) this hypothesis could not be confirmed because no SSIP [Li(THF)4]+ was detectable.

LiCl has been shown to increase solubility of RZnX reagent as well. Without LiCl, organozinc reagent remains on surface of zinc particle. With LiCl organozinc reagent forms a RZnX-LiCl complex, which is more soluble in THF.

Reactions 

In contrast to Turbo-Grignard compounds that are used for highly efficient Br/Mg exchange reactions, Turbo-Hauser bases are used as effective deprotonation reagents of functionalized aromatics. After deprotonation, the intermediate product (a Turbo-Grignard) can selectively be functionalized via addition of an electrophile (e.g. I2, -CHO).

Reactivity 

Turbo-Hauser bases are used as metalation/deprotonation reagents, like for example organolithiums. However, lithiated compounds are only stable at low temperatures (e.g. -78 °C) and competing addition reactions (like e.g. Chichibabin reactions) can occur. In contrast the magnesium compounds have more covalent and therefore less reactive metal-ligand bonds. Additionally, the whole magnesium amide complex is stabilized by LiCl. This is why Turbo-Hauser bases display a higher functional group tolerance and a much greater chemoselectivity at high and low temperatures.

iPr2NMgCl·LiCl can show a different reactivity compared to TMPMgCl·LiCl. Armstrong et al. showed that the TMP-Turbo-Hauser base easily metalates ethyl-3-chlorobenzoate in the C2 position, while the same reaction carried out with the iPr-Turbo-Hauser base resulted in no metalation at all. Instead, an addition-elimination reaction occurs.

Another difference in reactivity was shown by Krasovskiy et al. with the deprotonation of isoquinoline in THF solution. While TMPMgCl·LiCl required only 2h and 1.1 equivalents, iPr2NMgCl·LiCl needed 12h and 2 equivalents for comparable metalation.

On the one hand the different reactivity can be attributed to the higher kinetic basicity of the TMP compound compared to its homologous iPr-Turbo-Hauser base. On the other hand, the contrasting behaviour should also be reflected in the different aggregation state of both Turbo-Hauser bases in THF solution (monomer vs. dimer, see chapter above).
Generally, in organolithium chemistry monomeric species display the most active kinetic species. This could explain why reactions of the monomeric TMP-Turbo-Hauser base are much faster than that of dimeric iPr-Turbo-Hauser base.

Neufeld et al. suggested that the highly regioselective ortho deprotonation reactions of TMPMgCl·LiCl could stem from a sufficient complex-induced proximity effect (CIPE) between the bimetallic aggregate and the functionalized (hetero)aromatic substrate.

References 

Magnesium compounds